This article covers the weapons, vehicles and equipment of the Russo-Ukrainian war, involving the Armed Forces of Ukraine, the Armed Forces of the Russian Federation, the Donetsk People's Republic People's Militia, the Luhansk People's Republic People's Militia, and a number of other national guard and volunteer groups, from 2014 to the present date.

Equipment of Russian, DPR and LPR Forces

Equipment

Helmets 
 SSh-68
 6B47
 6B48
 LShZ
 TSh-4M

Optics and night vision 
 PU
 1P87
 MN-120
 InfiRay Saim SCL35

Small arms

Pistols and Revolvers 
 
 Nagant M1895
 OTs-38
 U-94 UDAR
 MP-443 Grach
 GSh-18
 SR-1 Vektor
 SR-2 Udav
 PSS
 Makarov PMM
 PM
 APS
 PB
 PSM
 P-96
 OTs-33 Pernach
 OTs-17 Berdysh
 OTs-23 Drotik
 Poloz
 TT-33
 TK
 MCM
 Fort-12

Submachine guns 
 PPSh-41
 PPS-43
 OTs-02 Kiparis
 PP-2000
 PP-19 Bizon
 PPK-20 Vityaz
 PP-90
 PP-90M1
 PP-91 KEDR
 PP-93
 MP 40
 PM-63 RAK
 Heckler & Koch MP5
 M1928 Thompson
 KRISS Vector

Shotguns 
 Saiga-12
 KS-23K
 TOZ-87
 RMF-93 Rys-F
 Molot Bekas-M
 Vepr-12
 MTs255
 MTs 21-12

Bolt-action rifles 
 Mosin-Nagant M1891/30
 Mosin-Nagant M44 Carbine

Semi-automatic rifles 
 SVT-40
 SKS
 Zastava M59/66
 Beretta Cx4 Storm

Assault rifles and carbines 
 

 AKM
 AKMS
 AK-47
 AK-74
 AKS-74
 AKS-74U
 AK-74M
 AN-94
 AK-103
 AK-105
 AK-203
 AK-12
 AK-15
 6P67 KORD
 AK-9
 9A-91
 ASM Val
 SR-3MP Vikhr
 OTs-14-4A Groza
 ShAK-12
 Malyuk
 FN FNC

Precision rifles 
 SVD
 SVDM
 VSSM Vintorez
 SV-98M
 VSK-94
 Lobaev TSVL-8 M1 Stalingrad
 Lobaev SVLK-14 Twilight
 Lobaev DXL-3 Retribution
 Lobaev DXL-5 Havoc
 SVCh
 MTs-566 7.62x51 Hunting Rifle
 Orsis T-5000
 Tikka T3
 Zbroyar Z-10
 Donchanka
 Shock

Anti-material rifles 
 PTRD-41
 PTRS-41
 ASVK
 OSV-96 Vzlomshchik
 VKS Vykhlop

Machine guns 

 DP-27
 RPD
 RPK
 DPM
 RPK-74
 RPK-74M
 RPK-16
 PK
 PKM
 PM M1910
 PM 1910/30
 PKP Pecheneg
 PKT
 SGM
 DShK
 KPV
 NSV
 Kord
 AEK-999

Explosives

Grenades 

 RG-41
 F-1
 RGO
 RGD-5
 RGN

Grenade launchers 
 GP-25 Kostyor
 RGM-40 Kastet
 GM-94
 AGS-17 Plamya
 AGS-30 Atlant

Flamethrowers
 RPO-A Shmel
 MRO-A

Rocket launchers and recoilless rifles 

 RPG-7
 RPG-18 Mukha
 RPG-22 Netto
 RPG-26 Aglen
 RPG-27 Tavolga
 RPG-28 Klyukva
 RPG-29 Vampir
 RPG-30 Kryuk
 SPG-9 Kopyo
 PSRL-1
 Panzerschreck
 Panzerfaust 3
 Carl Gustaf M2

ATGMs 

 9K111 Fagot
 9K114 Shturm
 9K115 Metis
 9M113 Konkurs
 9M133 Kornet
 NLAW
 FGM-148 Javelin

Mortars

Infantry and towed mortars 
 BM-37
 RM-38
 PM-43
 2B11 Sani
 2B14 Podnos
 2B9 Vasilek
 2B25 Gall

Self-propelled mortars 
 2S4 Tyulpan
 2S23 Nona-SVK

Artillery

Towed artillery 

 BS-3
 D-1
 D-20
 D-30
 MT-12 Rapira
 2A36 Giatsint-B
 2A65 Msta-B
 2B16 Nona-K

Self-propelled artillery 

 2S1 Gvozdika
 2S3 Akatsiya
 2S7 Pion
 2S7M Malka
 2S9 Nona
 2S19 Msta-S
 2S35 Koalitsiya-SV

Rocket artillery 

 BM-21 Grad
 BM-27 Uragan
 BM-30 Smerch
 9A52-4 Tornado
 TOS-1 /SoIntsepyok
 TOS-2 Tosochka
 Grad-K
 Cheburashka
 Snezhinka

Air defence

MANPADS 
 9K32 Strela-2
 9K34 Strela-3
 9K38 Igla
 9K333 Verba
 FIM-92 Stinger
 PPZR Grom

Anti-aircraft guns 
 AZP S-60
 ZU-23-2
 ITK 61 Sergei

Air defence platforms 

 ZSU-23-4 Shilka
 2K22 Tunguska
 9K33 Osa
 9K35 Strela-10
 9K37 Buk
 9K330 Tor
 Pantsir-S1
 S-300
 S-350 Vityaz
 S-400 Triumf

Electronic warfare and communication 
 51U6 Kasta-2E1
 R-330ZH Zhitel
 R-934B Sinitsa
 RB-109A Bylina
 RB-341V Leer-3
 RB-636 Svet-KU
 Borisoglebsk-2
 Repellent-1
 Stupor
 LPD-81
 1B76 Penicillin
 1L13 Nebo-SV
 1L125 Niobium-SV
 1L259M Zoopark-1
 1L269 Krasukha-2
 PPRU-1 Ovod-M-SV

Vehicles

Tanks 

 T-62
 T-64
 T-72
 T-80
 T-90

Tank destroyers 
 BMPT Terminator 2

Infantry fighting vehicles 

 BMP-1
 BMP-2
 BMP-3
 BMD-1
 BMD-2
 BMD-3
 BMD-4

Armoured personnel carriers 

 GT-MU
 MT-LB
 BTR-60
 BTR-70
 BTR-80
 BTR-82
 BTR-90
 BTR-D
 BTR-3
 BTR-4
 BTR-7
 BTR-MD Rakushka
 BMO-T
 DT-10 Vityaz
 DT-30 Vityaz
 GAZ-3344-20 Aleut
 Vepr
 AT105 Saxon
 M113 armored personnel carrier

Command vehicles 
 R-142
 R-145
 R-149
 R-166
 R-419
 R-439
 APE-5 
 MSh-5350
 MP-1IM
 MP-2IM
 Barnaul-T 9С932-1
 9S932-2
 P-260 Redut

Reconnaissance vehicles 
 BRDM-2
 BRM-1K Korshun
 PRP-4

Infantry mobility vehicles 

 KamAZ-63968 Typhoon
 KamAZ-53949 Typhoon-K
 KamAZ-435029 Patrol-A
 KamAZ-4386 Typhoon-VDV
 Ural-63095 Typhoon
 BPM-97 Vystrel
 GAZ-2975 Tigr
 GAZ-3937 Vodnik
 Iveco Rys
 Remdiesel Z-STS Akhmat
 M998/M1114/M1151 High Mobility Multipurpose Wheeled Vehicle 
 KrAZ Cobra
 KrAZ Cougar
 KrAZ Spartan
 KrAZ Shrek
 Ukrainian Armor Novator
 Kozak-2
 Triton
 BMC Kirpi

Recovery and engineering vehicles 
 BTS-4
 BREM-1
 BREM-1M
 BREM-2
 BREM-L Beglianka
 BREM-K
 REM-KL
 IMR-2
 IMR-3M
 BTS-4
 VT-72B
 BAT-M
 BAT-2
 TMM-3
 GMZ-3
 MDK-3
 UR-77 Meteorit
 PMP
 PTS-2
 PTS-2
 PTS-3
 TZM-T
 Uran-6
 Prohod-1
 BMR-3 Vepr

Utility and transport vehicles 

 

 KamAZ-4310
 KamAZ-4326
 KamAZ-4350
 KamAZ-5350
 KamAZ-6350
 KamAZ-65221
 KamAZ-65225
 KrAZ-214
 KrAZ-250
 KrAZ-255
 KrAZ-260
 KrAZ-5233
 KrAZ-6322
 GAZ-51
 GAZ-53
 GAZ-66
 GAZ-3308
 GAZ Sobol
 GAZ GAZelle
 Ural-375
 Ural-4320
 Ural-5323
 Ural-6370
 Ural-542301
 ZiL-131
 ZiL-157
 MAZ-537
 MAZ-7310
 UAZ-452
 UAZ-469
 UAZ-3163
 UAZ-23632
 UAZ-394511
 UAZ-515195
 BAZ-6402
 VAZ-2106
 PTS
 Toyota Hilux
 Bogdan-63172
 Bogdan-2351

Trains 
 Armoured train (Yenisei, Volga)

Aircraft

Fixed-wing 
 Antonov An-26
 Beriev Be-12
 Beriev A-50
 Mikoyan MiG-31
 Sukhoi Su-24
 Sukhoi Su-25
 Shkhoi Su-27
 Sukhoi Su-30
 Sukhoi Su-34
 Sukhoi Su-35
 Sukhoi Su-57
 Tupolev Tu-22M
 Tupolev Tu-95
 Tupolev Tu-214R
 Tupolev Tu-160
 Ilyushin Il-76

Rotary 

 Kamov Ka-52
 Mil Mi-2
 Mil Mi-8
 Mil Mi-24/35
 Mil Mi-26
 Mil Mi-28

Unmanned aerial systems

Unmanned combat aerial vehicles 
 Orion
 Forpost
 Mohajer-6

Reconnaissance drones 

 Orlan-10
 Orlan-20
 Orlan-30s
 Eleron-3
 Eleron-T28
 Takhion
 Forpost
 Granat-1
 Granat-2
 Granat-4
 Zala 421
 Zastava
 Merlin-VT
 Supercam S450
 DJI Mini 2
 DJI Air 2S
 DJI Mavic 3
 Gryfon-12
 Lastochka

Loitering munitions 

 ZALA Kub
 ZALA Lancet
 Chekan
 Geran-1
 Geran-2

Ships

Cruisers 
 Project 1134B Berkut B [Kara-class] (Ochakov)
 Project 1164 Atlant [Slava-class] (Moskva)

Frigates 
 Project 11356R/M [Admiral Grigorovich-class] (Admiral Essen, Admiral Makarov)

Corvettes 

 Project 21631 Buyan-M [Buyan-class] (Grad Sviyazhsk, Uglich, Velikiy Ustyug, Vyshniy Volochyok, Orekhovo-Zuyevo, Ingushetiya, Grayvoron)

Patrol vessels 
 Project 22160 (Vasily Bykov, Dmitriy Rogachev)
 Project 03160 Raptor

Amphibious warfare ships 
 Project 11711 [Ivan Gren-class] (Pyotr Morgunov)
 Project 775 [Ropucha class] (Tsezar Kunikov, Novocherkassk, Yamal, Azov, Korolev, Minsk, Kaliningrad, Georgy Pobedonosets, Olenegorsky Gornyak)
 Project 1171 Tapir [Alligator-class] (Saratov, Orsk, Nikolay Filchenkov)
 Project 11770 Serna [Serna-class]
 Project 02510 [Type BK-16]

Mine warfare ships 
 Project 266M Akvamarin [Natya-class] (Ivan Golubets)

Auxiliary vessels 
 Project 22870 (Spasatel Vasily Bekh)
 Project 23120 Longvinik [Elbrus-class] (Vsevelod Bobrov)
 Kommuna

Ground Forces' Towing and Motor Boats 
 BMK-150
 BMK-130

Submarines 
Project 636.3 Varshavyanka [Kilo-class] (Novorossiysk, Rostov-on-Don, Stary Oskol, Krasnodar, Velikiy Novgorod, Kolpino)

Ordnance

Small arms ammunition 
 5.45×39mm Soviet
 5.56×45mm NATO
 7.62×39mm Soviet
 7.62×42mm Soviet
 7.62×54mmR Russian
 9×18mm Makarov
 9×19mm Parabellum
 9×21mm Gyurza
 9×39mm Soviet
 12.7×55mm STs-130
 12.7×108mm Soviet
 14.5×114mm Soviet
 12 gauge

Aircraft Guns 
 GSh-30-1 (Sukhoi Su-30, Sukhoi Su-34, Sukhoi Su-35)

Air-to-air missiles 
 R-73 (Sukhoi Su-30, Sukhoi Su-34, Sukhoi Su-35)
 R-77 (Sukhoi Su-30, Sukhoi Su-34, Sukhoi Su-35)

Air-to-surface missiles 
 Kh-22 (Tupolev Tu-22M)
 Kh-29 (Sukhoi Su-34)
 Kh-31 (Sukhoi Su-30, Sukhoi Su-35)
 Kh-32 (Tupolev Tu-22M)
 Kh-47M2 Kinzhal (Mikoyan MiG-31K)
 Kh-55M  (Tupolev Tu-95, Tupolev Tu-160)
 Kh-58 (Sukhoi Su-35)
 Kh-59 Ovod (Sukhoi Su-34)
 Kh-101 (Tupolev Tu-95, Tupolev Tu-160)
 9K121 Vikhr (Mil Mi-28, Kamov Ka-50, Sukhoi Su-25)
 LMUR (Mil Mi-28)

Surface-to-surface missiles 
 3M-51 Alfa
 3M-54 Kalibr
 3M-59 Oniks
 9K720 Iskander
 9M728 Iskander-K

Air-to-surface rockets 
 S-8
 S-13

Bombs 
 FAB-250
 FAB-500
 KAB-500L

Equipment of Ukrainian and Ukrainian Volunteer Forces

Individual equipment

Helmets 
 SSh-40
 SSh-60
 SSh-68
 M1 helmet
 Mk 6 helmet
 Mk 7 helmet
 Enhanced Combat Helmet
 PASGT helmet
 FAST helmet
 Gefechtshelm M92
 Hjälm 90
 WZ 2005
 Type 88 helmet
 CG634

Optics and night vision 
 Aimpoint 3XMag
 Archer TSA-7
 ATN Mars HD 384
 AN/PVS-14
 M68 Close Combat Optic
 M150 Rifle Combat Optic
 C79 optical sight

Small arms

Pistols and Revolvers 

 Nagant M1895
 TT-33
 PM
 PB
 APS
 TK
 PSM
 MCM
 SSP-1
 Fort-12
 Fort-14
 Fort-15
 Fort-17
 Fort-20
 Fort-21
 Fort-28
 CZ 75
 CZ 82
 Glock 17
 Glock 19
 Glock 26
 Heckler & Koch USP
 Browning Hi-Power
 M9 pistol
 M18 pistol
 Kimber R7 Mako 
 Luger P08
 Heckler & Koch VP9

Submachine guns 
 PPD-40
 PPSh-41
 PPS-43
 Samopal vz. 48
 Škorpion vz. 61
 Heckler & Koch MP5
 MP 40
 Fort-224
 Agram 2000
 FN P90
 Brugger & Thomet MP9
 CZ Scorpion Evo 3
 Uzi
 Carl Gustaf m/45
 SIG Sauer MPX

Shotguns 
 Mossberg 500
 Benelli M4
 Saiga-12
 KS-23
 Fort-500
 Remington Model 870

Bolt-action rifles 
 Mosin-Nagant M44 Carbine
 Mannlicher M1895
 Mauser Karabiner 98k

Semi-automatic rifles 
 SVT-40
 SKS
 TOZ
 Savage MSR-15
 KRISS Vector
 Kel-Tec SUB-2000
 Zbroyar Z-15

Battle rifles 
 AVS-36
 Sturmgewehr 44
 Sturmgewehr 57
 Heckler & Koch G3
 M14 rifle
 FN FAL
 Beretta ARX200
 Robinson Armament XCR

Assault rifles and carbines 

 

 AK-47
 Type 56 assault rifle
 Type 56-1 assault rifle
 AKM
 AKMS
 AK-74
 AK-74M
 AKS-74U
 AN-94
 AK-12
 AK-103
 AS Val
 Malyuk
 Zbroyar UAR-15
 vz. 58
 FN FNC
 FN SCAR-L
 FN F2000
 Zastava M70
 MPi-KMS-72
 SIG Sauer MCX
 Fort-221
 Fort-227
 Fort-228
 Fort-229
 M4-WAC-47
 CZ 805 BREN
 CZ 806 BREN 2
 Colt Canada C7
 Colt Canada C8
 Steyr AUG
 Mk 18 Mod 0/1
 FB Tantal
 FB Beryl
 FB MSBS Grot
 Mayak MZ-10
 M16 rifle
 M4 carbine
 Adams Arms P1
 Remington ACR
 Bushmaster XM-15
 PM md. 90
 L85A2

Precision rifles 

 SVD
 SVU
 VSS Vintorez
 Hopak-61
 Zbroyar Z-008
 Zbroyar VPR-308
 Zbroyar Z-10
 Mayak MZ-10
 Fort-301
 Fort-222
 Brügger & Thomet APR
 Remington Model 700
 PSL
 GIAT FR F2
 Blaser R93 Tactical 2
 Cadex Defense CDX-33
 Accuracy International AWM
 Accuracy International AX
 Barrett M98B
 Sako TRG-22
 Tikka T3
 Ruger American
 M110 Semi-Automatic Sniper System 
 Savage Model 110
 Kimber Model 84 
 Desert Tech SRS
 Desert Tech HTI
 SIG Sauer SSG3000
 Sauer 100
 SV-98
 M21 sniper weapon system
 M24 sniper weapon system
 Type 85 marksman rifle
 Stiletto Systems STL-016

Anti-materiel rifles 
 Snipex Alligator
 Snipex T-Rex
 Snipex Rhino Hunter
 Snipex M100
 PGW Defence LRT-3
 ZVI Falcon
 Bushmaster BA50
 McMillan TAC-50
 AG 90 C
 Barrett M82
 Barrett M99
 Barrett M107
 SAN 511
 WKW Wilk
 SGM-12.7
 TASKO 7ET3
 PTRD-41
 PTRS-41

Machine guns 

 
 AA-52
 DP-27
 RP-46
 RPD
 RPK
 RPK-74
 Zastava M77
 MG 42
 Beretta MG 42/59
 Rheinmetall MG 3
 Heckler & Koch MG4
 CETME Ameli
 Fort-401
 Ksp 58 B
 UK vz. 59
 FN Minimi
 M2 machine gun
 M240 machine gun
 M249 light machine gun
 UKM-2000
 PK
 PM M1910
 DS-39
 DShK
 NSV
 KPV
 IWI Negev
 W85 heavy machine gun
 Arsenal MG-1M

Explosives

Grenades 
 VOG-25
 RGD-5
 F-1
 RDG-2
 RG-42
 RGN
 RGO
 RKG-3
 M18 smoke grenade
 M67 grenade
 L109 grenade
 DM41
 DM51
 RPG-40
 RPG-43
 Sirpalekäsikranaatti m/50

Grenade launchers 
 UAG-40
 AGS-17
 GP-25 Kostyor
 Fort-600
 RGP-40
 RGSh-30
 EAGLE grenade launcher
 M32 multi-shot grenade launcher
 M203 grenade launcher
 M320 grenade launcher module
 Mk 19 grenade launcher

Anti-personnel mines 
 MON-50
 MON-90
 MON-100
 MON-200
 OZM-72
 PMN-1
 PMN-2
 PMN-4
 DM-31
 M18 Claymore mine

Anti-tank mines 
 TM-57
 TM-62
 AT2
 DM 31
 DM 12 PARM 2
 HPD-2
 PK-14

Flamethrowers 
 RPO-A Shmel
 RPV-16

Rocket launchers and recoilless rifles 
 RPG-7
 RPG-16
 RPG-18 Mukha
 RPG-22 Netto
 RPG-26 Aglen
 RPG-27 Tavolga
 RPG-29 Vampir
 RPG-32 Nashshab
 RPG-75
 RPG-76 Komar
 Panzerfaust 3
 Instalaza C90
 M72 LAW
 M80 Zolja
 M141 Bunker Defeat Munition
 PSRL-1
 SPG-9 Kopyo
 MATADOR
 APILAS
 M136 AT4
 Carl Gustaf M2
 ATGL-L

ATGMs 

 9M111 Fagot
 9M113 Konkurs
 9M111MFB-1 Faktoria
 9K115 Metis
 9M117 Bastion
 Skif
 RK-3 Corsar
 MILAN
 NLAW
 FGM-148 Javelin
 BGM-71 TOW
 Alcotán-100
 Bulspike-AT
 Akeron MP

Mortars

Infantry mortars 
 50-RM-41
 107-PM-38
 120-PM-38
 82-BM-37
 82-PM-41
 120-PM-43
 2B11
 2B14 Podnos
 2S12 Sani
 M120-15 Molot
 KBA-48M
 LMP-2017
 120 KRH 92
 HM 15
 HM 16
 HM 19
 MO-120 RT
 240 mm mortar M240
 M224 Lightweight Company Mortar System
 20N5
 vz. 82 PRAM-L
 20N5
 M69

Self-propelled mortars 
 2S9 Nona
 Bars-8
 M113 Panzermörser

Artillery

Towed artillery 
 D-20
 D-44
 D-30
 L118 light gun
 2A36 Giatsint-B
 2A65 Msta-B
 2B16 Nona-K
 M-46
 MT-12 Rapira
 OTO Melara Mod 56
 M101 howitzer
 M119 howitzer
 M777 howitzer
 FH70 howitzer
 Pansarvärnspjäs 1110
 TRF1

Self-propelled artillery 

 2S1 Gvozdika
 2S3 Akatsiya
 2S5 Giatsint-S
 2S7 Pion
 2S19 Msta
 2S22 Bohdana
 ASU-85
 SpGH DANA
 ShKH Zuzana 2
 M109 howitzer
 CAESAR
 Panzerhaubitze 2000
 AHS Krab
 Archer
 L131 AS-90

Rocket artillery 

 BM-21 Grad
 BM-27 Uragan
 BM-30 Smerch
 Bureviy
 Vilkha
 RM-70 Vampir
 TLRG-230
 M142 High Mobility Artillery Rocket System
 M270 Multiple Launch Rocket System

Missiles 
 OTR-21 Tochka
 9K52 Luna-M
 R-360 Neptune
 Brimstone
 Martlet
 AGM-114 Hellfire
 Advanced Precision Kill Weapon System
 RGM-84 Harpoon

Air defence

MANPADS 

 9K38 Igla
 9K32 Strela-2
 9K34 Stela-3
 Piorun
 FIM-92 Stinger.
 Starstreak
 Mistral
 Chiron

Anti-aircraft guns 
 ZPU-1
 ZPU-2
 AZP S-60
 ZU-23-2
 ITK 61 Sergei
 Zastava M55
 Bofors 40 mm Automatic Gun L/70

Air defence platforms 

 ZSU-23-4 Shilka
 2K12 Kub
 2K22 Tunguska
 9K33 Osa
 9K35 Strela-10
 9K37 Buk
 9K330 Tor
 S-125 Pechora
 S-300 Antey
 Flugabwehrkanonenpanzer Gepard
 SIDAM 25
 Alvis Stormer
 Crotale
 NASAMS
 IRIS-T SL
 VAMPIRE
 Sol-Air Moyenne-Portée/Terrestre
 Excalibur Army Viktor
 AN/TWQ-1 Avenger
 MIM-23 Hawk
 MIM-104 Patriot
 RIM-7 Sea Sparrow

Electronic warfare and communication

Radars 
 P-14
 P-18 Terek
 P-19 Danube
 P-35 Saturn
 AN/TPQ-36 Firefinder
 AN/TPQ-48
 AN/TPQ-49 Forward Area Alerting Radar
 AN/MPQ-64 Sentinel
 SQUIRE
 COBRA
 ARTHUR
 Telefunken Radar Mobil Luftraumüberwachung-3D/4D
 Ground Master 200

Communications equipment 
 SpaceX Starlink
 Clansman

Jamming equipment 
 UAB EDM4S Sky Wiper
 Steelrock NightFighter
 NOTA

Vehicles

Tanks 
 M-55
 T-64
 T-72
 T-80
 T-84
 M-84
 PT-91 Twardy
 Kampfpanzer Leopard 2

Tank destroyers 

 AMX-10 Roues-Canon

Infantry fighting vehicles 
 
 BMP-1
 BMP-2
 BMP-3
 BMD-1
 BMD-2
 BVP M-80
 M2 Bradley
 Schützenpanzer Marder 1
 Combat Vehicle 90
 AMX-10P

Armoured personnel carriers 
 GT-MU
 MT-LB
 PTS
 BTR-60
 BTR-70
 BTR-80
 BTR-3 Hunter
 BTR-4 Bucephalus
 BTR-7 Defender
 BTR-D
 Vepr
 AT105 Saxon
 FV103 Spartan
 FV105 Sultan
 FV430 Bulldog
 M113 armored personnel carrier
 M557 command post carrier
 Véhicule de l'Avant Blindé 
 Opal
 Oncilla
 LAV 6 Armoured Combat Support Vehicle
 Sisu XA-185
 YPR-765
 M1126 Infantry Carrier Vehicle Stryker

Scout and reconnaissance vehicles 
 BRDM-1
 BRDM-2
 PRP-4
 FV107 Scimitar
 FV701 Ferret
 Polaris Ranger
 VOLS Petliura

Infantry mobility vehicles 

 Triton
 Kozak-2
 KrAZ Cobra
 KrAZ Cougar
 KrAZ Shrek
 KrAZ Spartan
 Bogdan Bars-6
 Bogdan Bars-8
 Ukrainian Armor Novator
 Dozor-B
 Gadfly
 Bushmaster Protected Mobility Vehicle
 Roshel Senator
 Iveco LMV
 Iveco VM 90
 AMZ Dzik
 URO VAMTAC
 Snatch Land Rover
 Alvis 4
 Mastiff
 Wolfhound
 Husky
 M998/M1025/M1097/M1114/M1116/M1152/M1167 High Mobility Multipurpose Wheeled Vehicle
 M1224 International MaxxPro Mine Resistant Ambush Protected
 M1280 Joint Light Tactical Vehicle
 M1117 Armored Security Vehicle
 MLS Shield
 BMC Kirpi
 ATF Dingo
 ACMAT Bastion
 GAIA Amir
 BATT UMG
 Panthera T6
 Inkas Titan-S
 Alvis Tactica
 Terradyne Gurkha
 Bandvagn 202
 Cougar

Recovery and engineering vehicles 
 BTS-4
 BTS-5
 BAT-2
 BREM-1
 BREM-2
 BREM-4K
 BREM-84 Atlet
 IRM
 RKhM Kashalot
 IMR-2
 MK-3
 MT-55
 MT-T
 MTO-AT
 MTU-12
 MTU-20
 MTU-72
 VT-72
 TMM-3
 GMZ-3
 MDK-2M
 UMP-350
 PMP
 UR-67
 UR-77
 M58 Mine Clearing Line Charge
 M88 Recovery Vehicle
 M984 Wrecker
 M1089 Wrecker
 FV106 Samson
 Brückenlegepanzer Biber
 Bergepanzer 2
 Bergepanzer 3 Büffel 
 Pionierpanzer 2 Dachs
 Wisent 1
 Challenger Armoured Repair and Recovery Vehicle
 Minewolf MW240
 Armtrac 400
 GMC TopKick

Utility and transport vehicles 
 GAZ-63
 GAZ-66
 GAZ-3307
 GAZ-3308
 ZIL-130
 ZIL-131
 ZIL-135
 ZIL-157
 ZiL-181
 ZiL-4331
 Ural-375
 Ural-4320
 Bogdan-63172
 KrAZ-214
 KrAZ-250
 KrAZ-255
 KrAZ-260
 KrAZ-5233
 KrAZ-6322
 KrAZ-6333
 KrAZ-6446
 KrAZ-6510TE
 MAZ AC-8-500
 MAZ-537
 MAZ-4371
 MAZ-5316
 MAZ-5334
 MAZ-5335
 MAZ-5337
 MAZ-7310
 BAZ T1618
 UAZ-452
 UAZ-469
 VAZ-2106
 VAZ-2121
 LuAZ-969
 GSP-55
 Isuzu Elf
 Wechselladersystem Multi
 MAN KAT1
 Mercedes-Benz Wolf
 Mercedes-Benz Unimog
 Mercedes-Benz Sprinter
 Steyr-Puch Pinzgauer
 Iveco ACM 80/90
 Iveco Astra SM 66.40 Prime Mover
 Iveco Trakker
 Renault Kangoo
 Renault Trucks D
 Renault GBC 180
 Renault TRM 1000
 Renault TRM 2000
 Volkswagen Transporter
 Dacia Dokker
 KIA Pregio
 Ford Transit
 Bogdan-2351
 Fiat Fullback
 Volkswagen Amarok
 Isuzu D-Max
 Mitsubishi Triton
 Mitsubishi Outlander
 Nissan Navara
 Toyota Land Cruiser
 Tarpan Honker
 Santana Anibal
 Ford Ranger
 Ford Raptor
 Great Wall Haval H3
 Dacia Duster
 SsangYong Actyon
 FV104 Samaritan
 RG-31 Nyala
 Bogdan-2251
 Argo 8x8
 HEP 70
 RMMV HX
 M35 series 2½-ton 6×6 cargo truck
 M113A4 Armored Medical Evacuation Vehicle
 M984 Heavy Expanded Mobility Tactical Truck
 M992 Field Artillery Ammunition Support Vehicle
 M1070 Heavy Equipment Transporter
 M1083 Medium Tactical Vehicle
 Jeep Wrangler
 Peugeot P4
 Peugeot 307
 Land Rover Defender
 Leyland 4-tonne truck
 Ark
 Volvo N10
 Toyota Mega Cruiser
 DAF YA-4440
 DAF YAZ-2300

Motorcycles 
 KMZ Dnepr MT-11
 ELEEK Atom
 Delfast Offroad

Unmanned ground vehicles 
 Milrem Robotics THeMIS

Aircraft

Fixed-wing 

 Aero L-39 Albatros
 Antonov An-12
 Antonov An-22
 Antonov An-26
 Antonov An-28
 Antonov An-30
 Antonov An-70
 Antonov An-72
 Antonov An-74
 Antonov An-124
 Antonov An-225
 Ilyushin Il-76
 Mikoyan MiG-29
 Sukhoi Su-24
 Sukhoi Su-25
 Sukhoi Su-27

Rotary 
 Mil Mi-2
 Mil Mi-8
 Mil Mi-14
 Mil Mi-17
 Mil Mi-24
 Messerschmitt-Bölkow-Blohm Bo 105
 Westland Sea King
 Airbus Helicopters H225

Unmanned aerial systems

Unmanned combat aerial vehicles 

 Baykar Bayraktar TB2
 SkyEye 5000mm Pro UAV
 DronesVision Revolver 860

Reconnaissance drones 

 Aeryon SkyRanger R60
 AeroVironment Quantix Recon
 Atlas Dynamics AtlasPRO
 RQ-11 Raven
 RQ-20 Puma
 MQ-27 ScanEagle
 Baykar Bayraktar Mini UAV
 IAI Bird-Eye
 WB Electronics FlyEye
 Sky-Watch Heidrun
 Tupolev Tu-141
 Tupolev Tu-143
 Ukrspecsystems PD-1
 Ukrspecsystems PD-2
 Leleka-100
 Ukrjet UJ-22 Airborne
 Ukrjet UJ-23 Topaz
 UA Dynamics Punisher
 Athlon Avia A1-CM Furia
 Spaitech Sparrow
 Spectator
 DJI Mini 2
 DJI Mavic 2
 DJI Mavic 3
 DJI Phantom 4
 DJI Matrice 300
 Brinc Lemur
 XDynamics Evolve 2
 Quantum Systems Vector
 Quantum Systems Scorpion
 EOS C VTOL
 Black Hornet Nano
 Parrot Anafi
 Autel EVO II
 Primoco One 150
 Shark
 Orlik
 UAV Factory Penguin C

Loitering munitions 
 AeroVironment Switchblade 300
 AeroVironment Switchblade 600
 Phoenix Ghost
 WB Electronics Warmate
 Ukrjet UJ-31 Zlyva
 Ukrjet UJ-32 Lastivka
 Athlon Avia ST-35 Silent Thunder
 DefendTex D40

Delivery drones 
 Malloy Aeronautics T150

Ships

Submarines 
 Project 641 [Foxtrot-class] (Zaporizhzhia)

Frigates 

 Project 1135 [Krivak-class] (Hetman Sahaidachny)

Corvettes 
 Project 1124 [Grisha-class] (Lutsk, Ternopil, Vinnytsia)
 Project 1241.2 Molniya-2 [Pauk-class] (Uzhhorod, Khmelnytskyi, Hryhoriy Hnatenko, Poltava)
 Project 1241 Molniya [Tarantul-class] (Pridneprovye, Kremenchuk)
 Project 11451 Sokol [Mukha-class] (Lviv, Luhansk)

Fast attack craft 
 Project 206MR [Matka-class] (Kakhovka)
 Project 1388N [Shelon-class] (Kherson)
 Project 205P Tarantul [Stenka-class] (Bukovyna, Donbas)

Patrol vessels 
 Project 745P [Sorum-class] (Korets)
 Project 58160 [Koral-class]
 Island-class (Sloviansk)
 Project 58155 [Gyurza-M-class] (Akkerman, Vyshhorod, Kremenchuk, Lubny)
 Project 1400M [Zhuk-class] (Obolon, KaMO-521, KaMO-527, Arabat, KaMO-517)
 Project 14670 [Gurzuf-class] (Lviv, Kryvyi Rih)
 Project RV376U [PO-2-class] (RK-796)
 Project 13432 Volga (head numbers: 8203, 8305, 8306, 8402)
 Project R1415 [Flamingo-class] (Feodosiya)
 Project 09104 [Kalkan-P-class] (BG-09, BG-11)
 Project 50030 [Kalkan-class] (BG-504, BG-304, BG-308, BG-310, BG-311, BG-304, BG-309)
 Katran-class (BG-820)
 UMS 1000-class (BG-18, BG-14, BG-24, BG-22, BG-23)
 Project 14720 [Hvilya-class]
 UMS 600-class (BG-721)

Amphibious warfare ships 
 Project 775 [Ropucha-class] (Konstantin Olshanskiy)
 Project 1232.2 Zubr [Pomornik-class] (Horlivka)
 Project 1176 [Ondatra-class] (Svatovo)
 Project 58503 Kentavr-LK [Centaur-LK-class] (Stanislav)

Mine warfare ships 
 Project 1258 [Yevgenya-class] (Henichesk)
 Project 266M Akvamarin [Natya-class] (Chernihiv, Cherkasy)
 Project 1265 Yakhont [Sonya-class] (Mariupol, Melitopol)

Special-purpose RIBs 
 BRIG Navigator N730M-class
 BRIG Navigator N700M-class (BG-40)
 Willard Sea Force 540/7M/11M-class
 Heavy Duty 460-class
 Brig Eagle 6-class

Auxiliary vessels 
 Omar-class (Langust)
 Type Ryf (Ryf)
 Project 1825 [Type Sever-2] (Sever-2)
 Project 1605 [Tethys-class] (BK-89-01, BK-72-05)
 Agent-1-class (Agent-1)
 MTK-200-class
 [No formal type or project number] explosive/reconnaissance drone boat (head no. 45V2NS1)
 Project 1844 [Toplivo-class] (Bakhmach)
 Project 1823/1824B [Muna-class] (Dzhankoi, Pereyaslav)
 Project 861 [Moma-class] (Simferopol)
 Project 522 [Niryat-class] (Vilnohirsk)
 Project 304 [Amur-class] (Donbas)
 Project 12884 [Bammbuk-class] (Slavutych)
 Project 714 [Goryn-class] (Kremenets)
 Project 1896 [Niryat II-class] (Skvyra)
 Project 1462 [Rubin-class] (Dmitry Chubar)
 Project 16830 Drofa (MGK-1694, MGK-1889)
 Project 737M [Sidehole-class] (Dubno)
 Project 254K [T43-class] (Velikaya Alexandrovka)
 Project R1415 [Flamingo-class] (RK-1935, Konotop)
 Project 376 [PO-2-class] (RVK-761, Delfin, RK-1931, U926)
 Project 371 (RK-1362, U002)
 Project 1394A (RK-603)
 Type Conrad-900 Aramis (RK-1695)
 Project 1390 Strizh (RK-735)
 Adamant 315-class (BG-732)
 Galia-280-class
 Type Cetus-136R (Hermes)
 Type Alkor (Fiolent)
 Type Tallinn 1/4 ton (Antika, Lira, Spray)
 Type Conrad-25RT (Yunona)
 Baba Hasan-class (Onyx)
 GTI SE 155 Sea-Doo-class
 Project 1784 (SM-15)
 Project 50150 [Nalim-class] (Nalim (project 50150))
 Project 1526 (Novgorod-Siversky)
 Project 14630 (MUS-482)
 Project 1758 (PD-51)
 Project 889 (PMR-152)
 Project 771 (Kalanchak)

Ground Forces' Towing and Motor Boats 
 BMK-150
 BMK-130

Ordnance

Small arms ammunition 
 5.45×18mm MPTs
 5.45×39mm Soviet
 5.56×45mm NATO
 .22 Long Rifle
 7.62×25mm Tokarev
 7.62×39mm Soviet
 7.62×51mm NATO
 7.62×54mmR Russian
 .308 Winchester
 .338 Lapua Magnum
 9×18mm Makarov
 9×19mm Parabellum
 9×39mm Soviet
 12.7×99mm NATO
 12.7×108mm Soviet
 14.5×114mm Soviet
 23×75mmR Soviet
 12 gauge

Recoilless gun projectiles 
 PG-9

Mortar shells 
 O-832DU
 M68P1
 JVA 1571

Artillery shells 
 155 BONUS
 M107 155mm projectile
 M549 155mm projectile
 M718 155mm Remote Anti-Armor Mine System
 M795 155mm projectile
 M982 155mm Excalibur

Air-to-air missiles 
 R-27 (Mikoyan MiG-29, Sukhoi Su-27)
 R-73 (Mikoyan MiG-29, Sukhoi Su-27)
 Cirit (Mil Mi-8)
 UMTAS (Mil Mi-8, Baykar Bayraktar TB-2)
 MAM (Baykar Bayraktar TB-2)

Air-to-surface missiles 
 AGM-88 High-speed Anti-Radiation Missile (Mikoyan MiG-29)
 Zuni 5-inch Folding-Fin Aircraft Rocket

North Atlantic Treaty Organisation 
While not directly involved in conflict, NATO has deployed a number of assets on its Eastern flank neighbouring Ukraine, Belarus and Russia.

Aircraft

Fighter 
 Lockheed Martin F-35A Lightning II (459/2,227)
 Lockheed Martin F-22A Raptor (183)
 General Dynamics F-16A/C/D/V Fighting Falcon (1,740/1,772)
 McDonnell Douglas F-15C/D Eagle (186)
 Boeing F-15EX Eagle II (12/104)
 Northrop F-5E/F/N Tiger II (62)
 Dassault Rafale C/D F4.1 (170/216)
 Dassault Mirage 2000-5F (25)
 Eurofighter Typhoon EF-2000 (406/461)
 Saab JAS 39C Gripen (28)
 KAI F/A-50PL Golden Eagle (0/48)
 Mikoyan-Gurevich MiG-29A/S Fulcrum  (34)
 Mikoyan-Gurevich MiG-21bis LanceR B/C (28)
Carrier-based aircraft

 Lockheed Martin F-35B/C Lightning II (403/760)

 Boeing F/A-18E/F Super Hornet (566/624)
 McDonnell Douglas F/A-18C/D Hornet (222)
 McDonnell Douglas AV-8B Harrier II Plus (177)
 McDonnell Douglas T-45C Goshawk (191)
 Canadair CF-18A Hornet (86)
 Dassault Rafale M (41)

Fighter-bomber

 McDonnell Douglas F-15E Strike Eagle (219)
 McDonnell Douglas F-4E Phantom II (72)
 Canadair CF-5A Freedom Fighter (19)
 Dassault Mirage 2000D RMV (68)
 Panavia Pa-200 Tornado IDS (197)
 Sukhoi Su-22M4 Fitter-K (18)

Ground attack

 Fairchild-Republic A-10C Thunderbolt II (282)
 AMX A-11B Ghibli (40)
 Sukhoi Su-25K "Grach" Frogfoot (14)

Bomber 
 Northrop Grumman B-2A Spirit (20)
 Rockwell B-1B Lancer (62)
 Boeing B-52H Stratofortress (72)
Light Attack Aircraft

Northrop AT-38B Talon  (576)
Boeing-Saab T-7A Red Hawk (2/350)
Dassault Alpha Jet 2E  (99)
 BAE Systems Hawk 128 T.2 (63)
 Alenia Aermacchi T-346A Master (38/48)
 Alenia Aermacchi T-345A (2/18)
 Aermachhi MB-339CD (70)
 CASA C-101EB Aviojet (41)
 Aero L-159A ALCA (24)
 Aero L-39NG Stage 2 (16)
 Aero L-59 Super Albatros (6)
 Aero L-39ZO Albatros (14)
 IAR 99C Șoim (20)
Aggressor squadron

 Douglas A-4M Skyhawk II (23)
 IAI F-21A Lion (6)
 Dassault Mirage F1E (65)
 Hawker Hunter FGA.9 (70)
 Aeromacchi MB-326G
 Atlas Cheetah C (12)
 Lockheed T-33B T-Bird
 BAC Jet Provost T.5A
 Cessna A-37B Dragonfly
 Canadair CL-41A Tutor
 Fouga CM.170-2 Magister
 Canadair Ct-133 Silver Star Mk 3AT

Reconnaissance, patrol and surveillance aircraft
 E/A-18G Growler
 RF-4E Phantom II
 Pa-200 Tornado ECR
 EC-130 Commando Solo III
 E-11
 E-9 Widget
 E-8 Joint STARS
 E-6 Mercury
 E-3 Sentry
 E-2 Hawkeye
 P-8 Poseidon
 P-3 Orion
 RC-135 Rivet Joint
 U-2 Dragon Lady

Tanker 
 KC-767
 KC-135 Stratotanker 
 KC-130 Super Hercules 
 KC-10 Extender 
 KC-46 Pegasus
 Airbus A330 MRRT

Transport 
 C-17 Globemaster III
 C-5 Super Galaxy
 C-12
 C-12 Huron
 C-20
 C-21 Learjet
 C-26 Metroliner
 C-27 Spartan
 C-31 Troopship
 C-37
 C-40 Clipper
 C-41 Aviocar
 C-130 Super Hercules
 C-130 Hercules
 C-145 Skytruck
 C-146 Wolfhound
 Airbus A400M Atlas

Unmanned aerial systems 
 MQ-9 Reaper
 RQ-4 Global Hawk

See also 
Ground Forces
 List of equipment of the Russian Ground Forces
 List of equipment of the Ukrainian Ground Forces

Naval Forces
 List of active Russian Navy Ships
 List of active Ukrainian Navy Ships

Air Forces
 List of active Russian Air Force aircraft
 List of active Ukrainian Air Force aircraft

References

Equipment
Military equipment of Russia
Russo-Ukrainian
Military equipment of Ukraine
Equipment
Russo-Ukrainian conflict